The 2011 Kontinental Hockey League All-Star Game was the All-Star game for the 2010–11 season of the Kontinental Hockey League (KHL). It took place on 5 February 2011 at the Ice Palace in Saint Petersburg, Russia. Although the captains of the all-star teams remained the same as the previous years, with Team Jágr playing against Team Yashin, under the new format Team Jagr is a team made up of Eastern Conference players (regardless of whether they are Russian or not) while Team Yashin is a team made up of Western Conference players.

Rosters

See also
2010–11 KHL season
Kontinental Hockey League All-Star Game

References

External links
 Official homepage

2011
All Star Game
Sports competitions in Saint Petersburg
February 2011 sports events in the United States
Kontinental Hockey League All-Star Game